Camon is a commune in the Ariège department in southwestern France. Nicknamed Little Carcassonne, it is one of the most beautiful villages of France.

Population

The inhabitants of the town of Camon are called Camonais in French.

See also
Communes of the Ariège department

References

Communes of Ariège (department)
Plus Beaux Villages de France
Ariège communes articles needing translation from French Wikipedia